Reiter (German for horserider), is a type of cavalry, which appeared in the armies of Western Europe in the 16th century

Reiter may also refer to:

 Reiter (surname), a German surname
 Der Blaue Reiter (The Blue Rider), a German group of expressionist artists in the early 20th century
 Die Apokalyptischen Reiter, a German heavy metal band
 Reiter, Washington, a community in the United States

See also 
 Reiter's syndrome (now known as reactive arthritis)
 Reuter
 Rieter, a Swiss producer of textile machinery and automobile components
 Reitter